Uncle George may refer to:

 The American theologian Increase N. Tarbox
 The fictional uncle of Bertie Wooster George Wooster
 "Uncle George", a song by Steel Pulse from the album Tribute to the Martyrs

See also
 George (disambiguation)